Kohneh Castle is a historical castle located in Kuhbanan County in Kerman Province, The longevity of this fortress dates back to the Safavid dynasty.

References 

Castles in Iran